Big Brother Angola: Tesouro is the Angolan version of the Big Brother reality television franchise produced by Endemol for DStv. The season began on 25 May 2014 and ran until 27 July 2014, with a total of 64 days. The show is hosted by Dicla Burity.

Housemates

Twists

Apartamento Baía Azul 
In the Launch Show, Nany was selected by random draw as the "Soba da Casa" (HoH). She had to evict 4 housemates. She chose to evict Sandra, Larama, Suzete and Massaqui, who went to the studio. However, there, they were given the news that they were not evicted, and moved to a special part of the House named "Apartamento Baía Azul". They lived there for 2 weeks.

Also, in the first eviction, the public were not voting for who they would like to evict, but were to move two contestants to "Apartamento Baía Azul". Essm and Rui were the most voted and moved to that area. They lived there for 1 week.

Kamba necklace 
Each week, a challenge determinates who would win the Kamba necklace. The winner was able to save a fellow housemate from eviction, giving him or her immunity. This twist is used in Big Brother Brasil since season 3.

Saboteur 
On Day 36, Petra Gama entered the house. She was hired by Big Brother to cause tensions and sabotage the tasks. However, that is unknown by the true housemates, who thought she was a new contestant and able to win the grand prize. She stayed in the house for one week, finishing her work on Day 43.

Fake nominations 
Also the same day Petra entered the house, Big Brother announced to audience that Week 6's nominations would be totally fake.

Nomination History 
First, there's the Soba challenge, and the winner gets the Soba da Casa (Head of House) title and is immune from nomination. After this, there's the Kamba challenge, in which the winner gives immunity to another housemates of his choice. Finally, the housemates make their nominations, exempt the HoH. The housemates with the most votes are up for eviction, and finally, the HoH chooses the last nominee.

Notes

References

External links 
 Official Site

Angola
2014 Angolan television seasons